North Terrace may refer to:

Holdfast Bay railway line in Adelaide, sometimes referred to as the North Terrace to Glenelg railway line
North Terrace, Adelaide, a street
North Terrace, Jerrabomberra in Queanbeyan, New South Wales

See also
Great Northern Terrace, a depot of the Stagecoach in Lincolnshire